Opuntia matudae, or xoconostle, is a cactus native to Mexico. It is sometimes treated as a synonym of Opuntia hyptiacantha. In 2019, a genetic study supported keeping the taxa distinct.

Uses 
Opuntia matudae is the most commercially important species of cactus referred to as 'xoconostle'. Opuntia joconostle is also referred to as 'xoconostle'.

The cactus fruit is consumed as a traditional medicine and food in Mexico.  In contrast to the common fruit (tunas) from related Opuntia ficus-indica, it is less sweet, the color is a bland greenish, and it is more used for traditional medicine than cuisine.  Its taste is more acidic (due to citric acid).  It has many green seeds in the central pit which is covered in red pigment from its antioxidant betalains.

References

matudae
Cacti of Mexico
Mexican cuisine
Medicinal plants
Plants described in 1981